The Free German Trade Union Federation ( or FDGB) was the sole national trade union centre of the German Democratic Republic (GDR or East Germany) which existed from 1946 to 1990. As a mass organisation of the GDR, nominally representing all workers, the FDGB was a constituent member of the National Front. The leaders of the FDGB were also senior members of the ruling Socialist Unity Party of Germany (SED).

Structure

The bureaucratic union apparatus was a basic component and tool of the SED’s power structure, constructed on the same strictly centralist hierarchical model as all other major GDR organizations.

The smallest unit was a Kollektiv, which nearly all workers in any organisation belonged to, including state leaders and party functionaries. They recommended trustworthy people as the lowest FDGB functionaries and voted for them in open-list ballots. The higher positions ranged from "Departmental Union Leader" (Abteilungsgewerkschaftsleiter, AGL) to Leader of the "Central BGL" (Betriebsgewerkschaftsleitung - Company Union Leadership in combines); they were normally full-time and held by SED members with a history of toeing the party line, or in some cases bloc party members. Their jobs, like those of the FDGB district leaders, were assured until they retired as long as they did not stray from party policy. 

The chairman of the FDGB was Herbert Warnke until his death on March 26, 1975, when he was replaced by Harry Tisch, a member of the SED’s Politburo, who kept the post until the political turnaround in 1989.

Membership

Chairmen 

Officially, membership in the FDGB was voluntary, but unofficially it was hardly possible to develop a career without joining . In 1986, 98% of all workers and employees were organized in the FDGB, which had 9.6 million members. This meant that it was nominally one of the world’s largest trade unions. As well as improving members’ career chances, the FDGB also offered various "concessions".

Function
In the East German system, the FDGB was in charge of ideological control and conformity in companies, as well as social tasks such as hospital visits, presenting awards, giving gifts on special anniversaries, even extending as far as organizing health spas and the hard-to-get holiday bookings. The FDGB’s own holiday service was responsible for the latter. 

Though formalized, the union held responsibility for setting work norms, through negotiating with management, protecting workers from management caprice, and enforcing GDR labor code and worker protections. There was a criticism that the union held too much power, e.g., it was a very lengthy and difficult process to fire a worker.

The single trade union was also very important as a source of new blood for the military. Using small benefits as an incentive, and if necessary gentle pressure, large numbers of workers and employees were recruited to what were known as "Combat Groups of the Working Class".

School 

In spring 1946, the former ADGB Trade Union School in Bernau bei Berlin, which before Nazi rule had belonged to the Allgemeiner Deutsche Gewerkschaftsbund (ADGB) (Federation of German Trade Unions), was given to the FDGB to use as a training centre. After some restoration work, the school opened in 1947 under the name FDGB-Bundesschule "Theodor Leipart" (Theodor Leipart FDGB Trade Union School). In January 1952 it was given degree awarding status and renamed Gewerkschaftshochschule "Fritz Heckert" (Fritz Heckert Trade Union College). In the early 1950s the FDGB considerably increased the size of the school, constructing new buildings on the site, in addition to those of the former ADGB school.  The original part of the school, completed in 1930, was a project of the Bauhaus design school and in 2017 it was added to the UNESCO World Heritage Site the Bauhaus and its Sites in Weimar, Dessau and Bernau.

Short term two and four week training courses and longer term study were offered, including collective bargaining, social and economic policy, youth and women’s issues, employment law, business administration, history of the labour movement, etc. After 1952 two year courses, and later, from 1956, three year bachelor degree-equivalent courses were also taught. From 1958 correspondence courses were also offered, and from 1959 courses were run for foreign trade unionists. Over 15,000 East German and 5,000 foreign trade unionists were trained by the FDGB school between 1947 and 1990.

The college closed in September 1990 just before  German reunification.

The buildings have been used by the Internat des Bildungszentrums der Handwerkskammer Berlin (Berlin Chamber of Skilled Crafts training school) since 2007.

German reunification
In May 1990, shortly before German reunification, the FDGB was dissolved. Many former members did not join the West German (now German) unions, some, due to the lightning privatization of the GDR, simply because they had lost their jobs.

Affiliates
The following unions were affiliated to the FDGB:

External links

References 

National trade union centers of Germany
Trade unions in East Germany
Trade unions disestablished in 1990
1990 disestablishments in East Germany
Defunct trade unions of Germany
World Federation of Trade Unions
Trade unions established in 1946
1946 establishments in Germany